Alexander R. Magno, popularly known as Professor Alex Magno, is a political scientist and academician in the Philippines.

Magno earned a Bachelor of Arts in political science from the University of the Philippines Diliman in 1975. He also obtained a Certificate from the University of Poitiers in France in 1980; and a Master of Arts in political science from the University of the Philippines Diliman in 1981.

Academe

Magno is a long-time faculty member at the Department of Political Science of the College of Social Sciences and Philosophy at the University of the Philippines Diliman. He has been the executive director of the University of the Philippines Third World Studies Center from 1994 to 1997. He also served as a consultant at the United Nations University from 1985 to 1988.

Government service

Magno was appointed by Philippine President Gloria Macapagal Arroyo as director of the Development Bank of the Philippines, one of the largest government financial institutions. Later, the President appointed him to concurrently serve as a member of the Consultative Commission for Charter Change, an independent body tasked to study and make recommendations for changes in the 1987 Philippine Constitution.

He served as a Special Adviser to the Speaker of the House of Representatives from 1996 to 1998.
He was also a consultant at the Department of Finance from 1996 to 1998; a consultant at the Department of Trade from 1996 to 1998; a consultant for the Peace Process at the Office of the Executive Secretary in 1996; and a consultant at the Philippine Senate from 1988 to 1998.

Media

Magno is an editorial columnist in such national dailies as the Manila Standard, Abante, and The Philippine Star. He is a contributing columnist at the Asian Wall Street Journal and at the Gulfnews. He was the editor of the Nation in Crisis, a publication of the University of the Philippines, in 1984.

Organizational affiliations

Magno is a commissioner of the EDSA People Power Commission, a nonprofit advocacy group established by former Philippine President Corazon Aquino to promote and preserve democracy and nonviolence in the country and elsewhere in the world.

He is also the President of the Foundation for Economic Freedom, and a long-time member of the Philippine Political Science Association.

He has also served as a member of the Board of Directors of Steelasia Manufacturing Corporation from 1998 to 2001.

References

External links
Development Bank of the Philippines
University of the Philippines College of Social Sciences and Philosophy

Filipino political scientists
Filipino educators
Filipino journalists
University of the Philippines Diliman alumni
Living people
The Philippine Star people
Year of birth missing (living people)
Recipients of the Presidential Medal of Merit (Philippines)